Arylakh (Arıılaax) is a rural locality (a selo) and the administrative center of Chuoninsky Rural Okrug of Mirninsky District in the Sakha Republic, Russia, located  from Mirny, the administrative center of the district. Its population as of the 2010 Census was 1,570; down from 1,666 recorded during the 2002 Census.

References

Notes

Sources
Official website of the Sakha Republic. Registry of the Administrative-Territorial Divisions of the Sakha Republic. Mirninsky District. 

Rural localities in Mirninsky District